The John C. Motter House is a Queen Anne style house built circa 1880, located in Frederick, Maryland.  The 3½ story house features beveled corners with brick corbels. The house was built in what was then a rural area beyond the north end of Frederick. The house is associated with Judge John C. Motter of the Maryland Sixth Judicial Circuit Court, who resided there from the 1880s to 1914.

The house is used as offices.

References

External links
, including photo in 1982, at Maryland Historical Trust

Queen Anne architecture in Maryland
Houses in Frederick County, Maryland
Houses completed in 1880
Houses on the National Register of Historic Places in Maryland
National Register of Historic Places in Frederick County, Maryland